is a zoo in Hiroshima, Japan.

Overview
Asa Zoological Park opened in 1971 in Asakita-ku, Hiroshima as the 62nd zoo in Japan.  The gross area of the zoo is 49.6 ha.  There are about 170 varieties of animals including giraffes, lions, black rhinoceroses, lesser pandas, woylies, Japanese giant salamanders and macaws.

They recruit citizen volunteers to explain the animals in detail and with humor to visitors.

Hours
From 1 January to 29 December
From 9:00 AM to 4:30 PM

Holidays
Every Thursday

History

Opened as the 62nd zoo in Japan on September 1, 1971.
World's first success of the artificial insemination of frozen sperm from a dead Chimpanzee in 1998.
Opened the animal contact areas for kids in 2001.
Night Safari started in the summer of 2003 and has run every summer since.

See also

Japanese Association of Zoos and Aquariums

External links
Asa Zoological Park
Japanese Association of Zoos and Aquariums

Parks in Japan
Parks and gardens in Hiroshima
Tourist attractions in Hiroshima
Zoos in Japan
1971 establishments in Japan
Buildings and structures in Hiroshima
Zoos established in 1971